Tales from Beyond is a horror anthology featuring four short stories as told to a couple who wander into a strange bookstore.

References

External links
 
 
 

2004 films
2004 horror films
American anthology films
American supernatural horror films
2000s English-language films
2000s American films